San Francisco Ballet dances each year at the War Memorial Opera House, San Francisco, and tours; this is the list of 2017 San Francisco Ballet repertory season with ballets and casts beginning with the opening night gala, Thursday, January 19, 2017.  The 2017 season is the company's 84th.  The Nutcracker is danced the year before.

2017 Gala "Ever Magical" 
Thursday, January 19, 2017,

The program for the gala

 Foragers by Myles Thatcher
 Pas de deux from Promenade Sentimentale by Liam Scarlett
 Pas de trois from Agon by George Balanchine
 Valses Poeticos by Helgi Tómasson 
 World Premiere Presentce by Trey McIntyre
 Pas de deux from Flames of Paris by Vasili Vainonen
 World Premiere The Chairman Dances by Benjamin Millepied
 "Purple" from Terra Firma by James Kudelka
 "Boogie Woogie Bugle Boy (of Company B)" from Company B by Paul Taylor
 Pas de deux from La Cathedrale Engloutie by Stanton Welch
 Diamonds by George Balanchine

Programs

Program one, Jan 24 - Feb 4 Mixed program "The Joy of Dance"  
 Haffner Symphony by Helgi Tomasson
 Fragile Vessels, a world premiere by 
 In The Countenance of Kings by Justin Peck

Program two, Jan 26 - Feb 5 Mixed program "Modern Masters" 
 Seven Sonatas by Alexei Ratmansky
 Optimistic Tragedy, a world premiere by Yuri Possokhov
 Pas/Parts 2016 by William Forsythe

Program three, Feb 17 - Feb 26 Full-Length "Frankenstein"  
 Frankenstein by Liam Scarlett

Program four, Mar 7 - Mar 18 Mixed program "Must-See Balanchine"  
 Stravinsky Violin Concerto
 Prodigal Son
 Diamonds
Each piece choreographed by George Balanchine

Program five, Mar 9 - Mar 19 Mixed program "Contemporary Voices"  
 Fusion, by Yuri Possokhov
 Salome, a world premiere by Arthur Pita
 Fearful Symmetries, by Liam Scarlett

Program six, Mar 31 - Apr 12 Full-Length "Swan Lake"  
 Swan Lake

Program seven, Apr 5 - Apr 18 Mixed Program "Made for SF Ballet"  
 Trio  by Helgi Tomasson
 Ghost in the Machine, a world premiere by Myles Thatcher
 Within the Golden Hour© by Christopher Wheeldon

Program eight, Apr 28 - May 7 Full length "Cinderella"  
 Cinderella by Christopher Wheeldon

2017 Company Roster
The company of the San Francisco Ballet:

Changes from 2016 season

Promotions and Additions
In May 2016, the company announced the following promotions and additions:
 Soloist Carlo Di Lanno was promoted to principal dancer.
 Corps de Ballet members Francisco Mungamba, Julia Rowe, Wei Wang, and WanTing Zhao became soloists.
 Apprentice Blake Kessler joined the corps de ballet.
 Aaron Robison, formerly a soloist with Houston Ballet, joined as principal dancer.
 Angelo Greco joined as soloist.  Greco previously danced with La Scala Ballet.  Greco was subsequently promoted to principal in February 2017.
 Elizabeth Mateer (from Pennsylvania Ballet II and Natasha Sheehan (from the San Francisco Ballet Trainee program) joined as corps de ballet members. 
 Ludmila Bizalion, formerly Ludmila Campos returned to the corps de ballet.  Bizalion was with the San Francisco Ballet as an apprentice in 2006 and a member of the corps de ballet from 2007 to 2010.  Before returning, she danced with Royal Ballet of Flanders, Hong Kong Ballet, Diablo Ballet, and Smuin Ballet.
 Five SF Ballet School Trainees were promoted to the rank of apprentice: Alexandre Cagnat, Shené Lazarus, Davide Occhipinti, Nathaniel Remez, and Isabella Walsh.
 Former corps members Gaetano Amico III and Grace Shibley were removed from the company roster.
 Former corps member Kristine Butler joined Bucharest National Opera Ballet Company of Romania.
Megan Amanda Ehrlich returned to the Company in 2017 after leaving to dance with Grand Rapids Ballet in 2016.
Former corps member Aaron Renteria joined The Joffrey Ballet in 2016.
 Five former apprentices moved on from the company:
 Chisako Oga joined Cincinnati Ballet
 Grace Choi joined Tulsa Ballet II.
 Haruo Niyama joined The Washington Ballet.
 Anastasia Kubanda and Francisco Sebastião were removed from the company roster.
 Soloist Sasha De Sola was promoted to principal dancer, effective January 1, 2017.
 San Francisco Ballet announced the following mid-season promotions:
 Soloist Jennifer Stahl was promoted to the rank of principal dancer, effective July 1, 2017
 Max Cauthorn was promoted to soloist
 Isabella DeVivo, Jahna Frantziskonis, Esteban Hernandez, and Steven Morse were promoted to soloists, effective July 1, 2017.

Dancers

Principal Dancers

Principal character dancers

Ricardo Bustamante
Val Caniparoli

Rubén Martín Cintas

Anita Paciotti

Soloists

Max Cauthorn
Daniel Deivison-Oliveira
Koto Ishihara
Francisco Mungamba 
Julia Rowe
James Sofranko
Jennifer Stahl
Lauren Strongin
Anthony Vincent
Wei Wang
Hansuke Yamamoto
WanTing Zhao

Corps de Ballet

Kamryn Baldwin
Sean Bennett
Ludmila Bizalion
Samantha Bristow
Thamires Chuvas
Diego Cruz
Isabella DeVivo
Megan Amanda Ehrlich
Jahna Frantziskonis
Benjamin Freemantle
Jordan Hammond
Jillian Harvey

Esteban Hernandez
Ellen Rose Hummel
Blake Kessler
Elizabeth Mateer
Norika Matsuyama
Lee Alex Meyer-Lorey
Steven Morse
Kimberly Marie Olivier
Sean Orza
Lauren Parrott
Elizabeth Powell
Alexander Reneff-Olson

Rebecca Rhodes
Emma Rubinowitz
Skyla Schreter
Natasha Sheehan
Henry Sidford
Miranda Silveira 
John-Paul Simoens
Myles Thatcher
Mingxuan Wang
Lonnie Weeks
Maggie Weirich
Ami Yuki

Apprentices
These SF Ballet School Trainees were promoted to the rank of apprentice: 
 Alexandre Cagnat
 Shené Lazarus
 Davide Occhipinti
 Nathaniel Remez
 Isabella Walsh

Artistic Staff
Source:

Artistic Director & Principal Choreographer: Helgi Tomasson
Ballet Master & Assistant to the Artistic Director: Ricardo Bustamante
Ballet Masters
Felipe Diaz
Betsy Erickson
Anita Paciotti
Katita Waldo
Company Teachers
Helgi Tomasson
Ricardo Bustamante
Felipe Diaz
Choreographer in Residence: Yuri Possokhov
Music Director and Principal Conductor: Martin West
Other Artistic Staff
Caroline Giese, Artistic Administrator
Alan Takata-Villareal, Logistics Manager
Abby Masters, Assistant to the Artistic Staff

Music Director and Musicians
Music Director & Principal Conductor: Martin West

Strings

Woodwinds

Brass

Percussion

*Extra Player
**Season Substitute

References

External links

San Francisco Ballet
Lists of ballets by company
Ballet
2017 in San Francisco